Players born on or after 1 January 1990 were eligible to participate in the tournament. Players' age as of 21 July 2009 – the tournament's opening day. Players in bold have later been capped at full international level.

Group A

Head coach:  Brian Eastick

Head coach:  Miloš Kostič

Head coach:  Claude Ryf

Head coach:  Yuri Kalitvintsev

Group B

Head coach:  Jean Gallice

Head coach:  Aleksandar Stanojević

Head coach:  Luis Milla Assistant : Julen Lopetegui

Head coach:  Ogün Temizkanoğlu

External links 
Official UEFA site

Squads
UEFA European Under-19 Championship squads